The following lists events that happened in 1962 in Libya.

Incumbents
Monarch: Idris 
Prime Minister: Muhammad Osman Said

Events
 Libyan Eastern Championship 1962–63

Establishments
 United Libya Airlines

 
Years of the 20th century in Libya
Libya
Libya
1960s in Libya